The montane hutia (Isolobodon montanus) is an extinct species of rodent in the subfamily Capromyinae. It was endemic to Hispaniola (the Dominican Republic and Haiti).

History
The remains were found in association with those from rats of the genus Rattus, which suggests that the montane hutia survived until the time of European colonization of the island, and may have gone extinct due to competition from introduced rodents.

References

Isolobodon
Rodent extinctions since 1500
Mammals of Hispaniola
Mammals of the Dominican Republic
Mammals of Haiti
Mammals of the Caribbean
Extinct animals of Haiti
Extinct animals of the Dominican Republic
Mammals described in 1922
Taxonomy articles created by Polbot